This is a growing List of Buddhist Sanghas and Governing Bodies. A sangharaja or patriarch is the senior monk of a Buddhist Sangha.  A supreme sangharaja is the head of more than one Buddhist order.

Sanghas of Bangladesh

Sanghas of Canada - Vesak in Ottawa Connects the World

Vesak in Ottawa Connects the World www.VesakInOttawa.com - Facebook: ProjectVesakInOttaw

Sanghas of Bangladesh

Sangha of Laos

Sanghas of Thailand

Sangha of Vietnam

See also
Supreme Patriarch of Thailand
Supreme Patriarch of Cambodia

References 

Religious leadership roles
+